The 2021 South Carolina State Bulldogs football team represented South Carolina State University as a member of the Mid-Eastern Athletic Conference (MEAC) in the 2021 NCAA Division I FCS football season. The Bulldogs, led by 20th-year head coach Oliver Pough, played their home games at Oliver C. Dawson Stadium.

On November 13, the Bulldogs clinched a berth in the Celebration Bowl; the team completed their regular season with a 5–0 record in conference play, 6–5 overall. The Bulldogs upset SWAC champions and 15th-ranked Jackson State 31-10 in the Celebration Bowl, their first postseason win since the December 1994 Heritage Bowl.

Schedule

References

South Carolina State
South Carolina State Bulldogs football seasons
Black college football national champions
Mid-Eastern Athletic Conference football champion seasons
Celebration Bowl champion seasons
South Carolina State Bulldogs football